Desamuduru is a 2007 Indian Telugu-language romantic action film directed by Puri Jagannadh and produced by DVV Danayya. The film stars Allu Arjun and debutante Hansika Motwani. It was released on 12 January 2007 in 400 theatres.

Plot

Bala Govind is a program director in MAA TV, whose fights for justice regularly get him into trouble. During one of these incidents, he saves a person from goons while severely thrashing the notorious smuggler Tambi Durai's son Murugesan. Fearing retribution from Tambi Durai, the MAA TV crew sends Bala's team to Kullu Manali to shoot a travel episode. After reaching Manali, Bala sees Vaishali, a sannyasin, and soon falls in love with her.

Though initially apprehensive of Bala, Vaishali recropriates his feelings. The ashram's head sannyasin, Rama Prabha also accepts their relationship. Before Bala is able to return to Hyderabad with Vaishali, Tambi Durai's henchmen kidnap her and take her to his home. The person, who was saved by Bala reveals that Vaishali is the daughter of a businessman named Narayan Patwari.

In order to grab Patwari's properties, Tambi Durai killed her parents, and his wife Andal performs the marriage of Vaishali with Murugesan. However, Vaishali escapes and reaches Kullu Manali. Bala seeks the help of Inspector Prasad to save Vaishali from their clutches, where he eventually succeeds in arresting Tambi Durai and marries Vaishali.

Cast

Production 
After the release of Happy (2006), Allu Arjun was reported to be keen to act in the Telugu remake of Sivakasi (2005) starring Vijay and Asin. He later accepted to act in a film directed by Puri Jagannadh and produced by DVV Danayya under the banner Universal Media. The title was confirmed as Desamuduru. Puri Jagannadh worked on the film's script at Bangkok and returned to Hyderabad on 16 June 2006. The film had its official launch at the office of Puri Jagannadh's production company Vaishno Academy on 19 June 2006.

Casting 

Allu Arjun played the role of a crime reporter working for MAA TV in the film. For his role, Allu Arjun sported a long hairdo and built six pack abs. Hansika Motwani was selected as the female lead which marked her debut in Telugu cinema as an actress at a very young age of 16. She played the role of a sanyasin in the film. Rambha was selected for an item number in the film, despite initial reports stated that Charmee Kaur would dance in the song.

Filming 
Filming began on 14 July 2006 at Hyderabad where the film's first  schedule was shot. The next schedule began in Himachal Pradesh. Few action sequences were shot at Manali in early September 2006. Weeks later, few scenes between the lead pair were shot in Uttaranchal and Himachal Pradesh. This schedule was planned to be wrapped up on 5 December 2006. However the schedule was completed  on 10 October 2006. Some crucial action sequences were shot at Aluminium Factory in Gachibowli in early December 2006.

Soundtrack

The film has six songs composed by Chakri. Music of the film was launched on 25 December 2006. The song "Ninne Ninne" was the most popular song in the soundtrack among music lovers.

Release
The film was released on 500 screens, including 424 in Andhra Pradesh, 32 in Karnataka, 8 in Orissa, 2 in Chennai, 3 in Mumbai and 31 overseas.

Box office
Desamuduru ran for more than 175 days. The film grossed 12.58 crore and a share of 9.5 crore. worldwide in the first week of its release. The film grossed 20 crore in four weeks. It ran for more than 365 days. The film grossed 20 crore in four weeks.

The film is one of the most successful films in Allu Arjun's career at the time of its release and one of the highest-grossing movies of 2007. This movie's dubbed version was released in Kerala titled as `Hero´. This movie was a blockbuster in Kerala too.

Accolades
55th Filmfare Awards
Best Film – DVV Danayya – Nominated
Best Director – Puri Jagannadh – Nominated
Best Actor – Allu Arjun – Nominated
Best Music Director – Chakri – Nominated
Filmfare Award for Best Female Debut – South – Hansika Motwani – Won

Nandi Awards
Best Choreographer – Nobel – "Satte E Godava Ledu" – Won

Santosham Film Awards
Best Young Performers – Allu Arjun – Won
Best Debut Heroine – Hansika Motwani – Won

CineMAA Awards
Best Actor (Jury) – Allu Arjun – Won
Best Female Debut – Hansika Motwani – Won

References

External links
 

2007 films
2000s Telugu-language films
Indian crime action films
Films scored by Chakri
Indian romantic musical films
2000s romantic musical films
2000s crime action films
Indian romantic action films
Indian films about revenge
2000s masala films
Films about journalists
Journalism adapted into films
Films about the mass media in India
Films directed by Puri Jagannadh
Films set in Hyderabad, India
Films shot in Hyderabad, India
Films set in Himachal Pradesh
Films shot in Himachal Pradesh
2000s romantic action films